Kanatlarci, according to the 2001 census, is the largest village and second largest settlement in the municipality of Prilep, North Macedonia. It used to be part of the former municipality of Topolčani.

Demographics
According to the 2002 census, the village had a total of 972 inhabitants. Ethnic groups in the village include:

Turks 791
Macedonians 111
Bosniaks 69
Albanians 1

References

External links

Villages in Prilep Municipality
Turkish communities in North Macedonia